Wilson County is a county located in the U.S. state of Texas. As of the 2020 census, its population was 49,753. Its county seat is Floresville. The county is named after James Charles Wilson. Wilson County is part of the San Antonio–New Braunfels, Texas, metropolitan statistical area.

History

Native Americans
Archeological evidence in the Wilson County area reveals early habitation from the paleo-Indians hunter-gatherers period. Later, the area was a hunting range for Tonkawa,  Karankawa. Tawakoni, Lipan Apache, and Comanche who lived in the area.

Explorations and county established

In September 1718 Martín de Alarcón crossed the area on his way to explore the bay of Espíritu Santo.  Pedro de Rivera y Villalón crossed the county in 1727 as part of an expedition to inspect the frontier defenses of New Spain.
In 1766–67 the Marqués de Rubí included the area in his inspection of the Spanish frontier, and the 1798 explorations of the coast by Francisco Vásquez de Coronado skirted the area.

The first two land grants in the area were to Luis Menchaca and Andrés Hernández, who established ranches circa 1832–1833.

Anglos began arriving in the 1840s, and Southern planters in 1850 and 1860, followed by German and Polish immigrants from other counties.

Wilson County was formed in 1860 from Bexar County and Karnes County.   Sutherland Springs was designated the county seat.

Wilson County voted in favor of secession from the Union, and sent several military units to serve.  Wartime hardships were compounded by a three-year drought.

Following the civil war, the county seat was moved to Floresville.  The 1872 courthouse was destroyed by fire and replaced in 1884 with a new building designed by Alfred Giles.

Fence Cutting Wars in Texas lasted for approximately five years, 1883–1888.  The  ranch of Houston and Dilworth became the focal point in Wilson County.  As farmers and ranchers began to compete for precious land and water, cattlemen found it more difficult to feed their herds, prompting cowboys to cut through fences.  Texas Governor John Ireland prodded a special assembly to order the fence cutters to cease.  In response, the legislature made fence-cutting and pasture-burning crimes punishable with prison time, while at the same time regulating fencing. The practice abated with sporadic incidents of related violence 1888.

The San Antonio and Aransas Pass Railway reached Floresville in 1886.  In 1898 the San Antonio and Gulf Railroad was extended to Stockdale.

Geography

Major highways
  U.S. Highway 87
  U.S. Highway 181
  State Highway 97

Adjacent counties
 Guadalupe County (north)
 Gonzales County (northeast)
 Karnes County (southeast)
 Atascosa County (southwest)
 Bexar County (northwest)

Demographics

Note: the US Census treats Hispanic/Latino as an ethnic category. This table excludes Latinos from the racial categories and assigns them to a separate category. Hispanics/Latinos can be of any race.

As of the census of 2000, there were 32,408 people, 11,038 households, and 8,830 families residing in the county.  The population density was 40 people per square mile (16/km2).  There were 12,110 housing units at an average density of 15 per square mile (6/km2).  The racial makeup of the county was 81.19% White, 1.21% Black or African American, 0.58% Native American, 0.30% Asian, 0.04% Pacific Islander, 14.25% from other races, and 2.43% from two or more races.  36.52% of the population were Hispanic or Latino of any race.

There were 11,038 households, out of which 40.00% had children under the age of 18 living with them, 66.50% were married couples living together, 9.20% had a female householder with no husband present, and 20.00% were non-families. 17.10% of all households were made up of individuals, and 7.80% had someone living alone who was 65 years of age or older.  The average household size was 2.89 and the average family size was 3.26.

In the county, the population was spread out, with 29.20% under the age of 18, 7.60% from 18 to 24, 28.60% from 25 to 44, 23.20% from 45 to 64, and 11.50% who were 65 years of age or older.  The median age was 36 years. For every 100 females, there were 99.70 males.  For every 100 females age 18 and over, there were 97.00 males.

The median income for a household in the county was $40,006, and the median income for a family was $45,681. Males had a median income of $31,716 versus $23,582 for females. The per capita income for the county was $17,253.  About 9.20% of families and 11.30% of the population were below the poverty line, including 12.40% of those under age 18 and 15.80% of those age 65 or over.

Communities

Cities
 Elmendorf (mostly in Bexar County)
 Floresville (county seat)
 La Vernia
 Nixon (mostly in Gonzales County)
 Stockdale

Towns
 Poth

Unincorporated communities

 Calaveras
 Carpenter
 Kicaster
 Kosciusko
 Pandora
 Saspamco
 Sutherland Springs
 Union

Ghost towns
 Dewees
 Doseido Colony
 Grass Pond Colony
 Sandy Hills

Education
School districts include:
 Falls City Independent School District
 Floresville Independent School District
 La Vernia Independent School District
 Nixon-Smiley Consolidated Independent School District
 Poth Independent School District
 Stockdale Independent School District

All of the county is in the service area of Alamo Community College District.

Notable people
 John Connally, governor of Texas and U.S. Secretary of the Navy and Treasury
 Merrill Connally, an actor and a county judge
 Wayne Connally, a member of both houses of the Texas State Legislature
 Frank Hamer, Texas Ranger
 Stephen Willeford, civilian who intervened during the Sutherland Springs church shooting

Gallery

Politics
Wilson County is a strongly Republican county in presidential elections. It last voted for a Democrat in 1976, when it supported Georgia's Jimmy Carter. More recently, in 2020, it gave a quarter of its vote to Democratic candidate Joe Biden. The last time a Democratic candidate won 35% or more of Wilson County's vote was in 1996.

See also
 List of museums in South Texas
 National Register of Historic Places listings in Wilson County, Texas
 Recorded Texas Historic Landmarks in Wilson County
 Wilson County Courthouse and Jail

References

External links
 
 Historic Wilson County materials, hosted by the Portal to Texas History.
 Wilson County Historical Society
 Wilson County government's website

 
1860 establishments in Texas
Greater San Antonio
New Braunfels, Texas
Populated places established in 1860